Exerodonta melanomma is a species of frog in the family Hylidae.
It is endemic to Mexico.
Its natural habitats are subtropical or tropical moist montane forests, rivers, and intermittent rivers.
It is threatened by habitat loss.

References

Sources

Exerodonta
Amphibians described in 1940
Taxonomy articles created by Polbot